Paradoxophyla palmata is a species of frog in the family Microhylidae.
It is endemic to Madagascar.
Its natural habitats are subtropical or tropical moist lowland forests, intermittent freshwater marshes, and heavily degraded former forest.
It is threatened by habitat loss.

References

Paradoxophyla
Endemic frogs of Madagascar
Taxa named by Jean Marius René Guibé
Taxonomy articles created by Polbot
Amphibians described in 1974